Victor de Bedia Oland,  (August 9, 1913 – June 27, 1983) was the 24th Lieutenant Governor of Nova Scotia from 1968 to 1973.

Awards and recognition 

In 1980, he was made an Officer of the Order of Canada.

References 

1913 births
1983 deaths
Lieutenant Governors of Nova Scotia
Officers of the Order of Canada